Joel Milburn  (born 17 March 1986) is an Australian Dual Olympic 400m sprinter. His Personal Best time for the 400m is 44.80 seconds which he achieved in at the 2008 Summer Olympics in Beijing. Joel is currently the 5th all time fastest Australian 400m sprinter.

Joel won the Australian National 400 m Championship in 2008. He was then selected for the 400m & 4x400m relay at the 2008 Summer Olympics in Beijing where he made the semi-finals of the individual 400 meters competition. He placed 13th overall in Beijing in the 400m Individual and 5th in the 4x400m relay with a time of 3.00.02 after Russia was disqualified. Joel has represented Australia numerous times at the IAAF World Championships, IAAF World Indoor Championships, Commonwealth Games as well as the Asia-Pacific region (55 nations) at the 2010 IAAF Continental Cup in the 4x400m relay.

Joel Milburn's Australian Caps and international representation:

2012 Olympic Games - London, England. - (DNS)
2010 Commonwealth Games - Delhi, India. -
2010 IAAF Continental Cup - Split, Croatia.
2009 IAAF World Championships - Berlin, Germany.
2008 Beijing Olympic Games - Beijing, China.
2008 IAAF World Indoor Championships - Valencia Spain.
2007 World University Games - Bangkok, Thailand.
2004 IAAF World Junior Championships - Grosseto, Italy. - (DNS)
2003 IAAF World Youth Championships - Sherbrooke, Canada.

Personal

Joel was arrested in Sydney on 17 October 2019 and accused of possessing a small amount of a prohibited drug. Charges were dismissed in court.

Joel completed a Psychology degree at Macquarie University in 2012 and has a Graduate Diploma in Business Management. He currently is employed in management in Cyber Security in Sydney for a large cyber security firm.

References

Australian male sprinters
Athletes (track and field) at the 2008 Summer Olympics
Olympic athletes of Australia
1986 births
Living people
People educated at Trinity Grammar School (New South Wales)
Commonwealth Games gold medallists for Australia
World Athletics Championships athletes for Australia
Athletes (track and field) at the 2010 Commonwealth Games
Commonwealth Games medallists in athletics
Universiade medalists in athletics (track and field)
Universiade silver medalists for Australia
Medalists at the 2007 Summer Universiade
Medallists at the 2010 Commonwealth Games